The Jordan EJ13 was the car with which the Jordan team competed in the 2003 Formula One season.
The car was designed by Gary Anderson and Nicoló Petrucci and driven by Giancarlo Fisichella, Ralph Firman and Zsolt Baumgartner who replaced Firman who was injured for two races.

Overview 
The team slumped due to lack of sponsorship and Honda left Jordan to concentrate on their partnership with BAR. Jordan had to make do with 2002-specification Cosworth CR-4 engines badged as Ford RS1, and the season was not regarded as a success. The EJ13 debuted in January 2003 in Barcelona.

Despite beating only Minardi to rank 9th in the standings, Jordan won in 2003. The win came under extraordinary circumstances in the 2003 Brazilian Grand Prix which took place in torrential weather conditions. Following a massive accident on the start / finish straight, the race was red flagged and stopped. After some initial confusion, Giancarlo Fisichella was initially ruled to have finished a still remarkable second behind Kimi Räikkönen who took the top step on the podium. However, an FIA inquiry several days later led to Fisichella being officially declared the winner of his first F1 race. Fisichella was, therefore, unable to celebrate his first career victory on the top step of the podium, although he and Räikkönen swapped trophies in a presentation at the following Grand Prix. Aside from the unlikely win, neither Fisichella or new teammate Ralph Firman were able to have any sort of success in their Jordans. After Firman was injured in practice for the 2003 Hungarian Grand Prix Jordan fielded the first ever Hungarian Formula One driver, Zsolt Baumgartner. Firman returned for the final two events, but was unable to add to the point he won in Spain. Fisichella only managed two points on top of his victory and unhappy at the team's slump he departed for Sauber.

In June 2003 Jordan sued mobile phone company Vodafone for £150 million, claiming that the company had made a verbal contract for a three-year sponsorship, then gave it to Ferrari instead.  Jordan withdrew the action two months later, agreeing to pay Vodafone's costs. This was a double financial blow from which the team did not recover. The judge was highly critical of Eddie Jordan, branding the allegations against Vodafone "without foundation and false".

Complete Formula One results
(key) (results in bold indicate pole position)

References

Jordan Formula One cars
2003 Formula One season cars